Prince Edward Island Route 5 is a highway in eastern Prince Edward Island.

Route 5 begins at the Trans Canada Highway, Prince Edward Island Highway 1 bearing east. It passes the junctions with Robertson Road and Klondike Road, arriving at Monaghan Road or Route 213 at km 7.5 (mi 4.7). Junction Route 216, Avondale Road is at km 12.0 (mi 7.5). Route 5 passes the junction with Gauls Road, Fariville Road, till the junction with Route 213, Brothers Road at km 16.4 (mi 10.2), within Kings County. At km 18.5 (mi 11.5), Route 5 meets with the intersection of Route 323, Curran Road. At km 18.5 (mi 11.5), Route 5 makes the intersection with Route 22. Route 5 continues west meeting Old Mt. Stewart Road and Route 356 at a 5 corners intersection. Route 5 continues in a south east direction passing Johnston Road, and Straghbohgle Road before ending at km 27.8 (mi 17.3), Route 4.

References

See also
List of Prince Edward Island provincial highways

Prince Edward Island provincial highways
Roads in Kings County, Prince Edward Island
Roads in Queens County, Prince Edward Island